is a railway station in the city of Toyota, Aichi Prefecture, Japan, operated by the third sector Aichi Loop Railway Company.

Lines

Station layout
The station has two opposed side platforms, connected by a footbridge. The station building has automated ticket machines, TOICA automated turnstiles and is staffed.

Platforms

Adjacent stations

Station history
Suenohara Station was opened on January 31, 1988 together with the opening of the Aichi Loop Railway Line.

Passenger statistics
In fiscal 2017, the station was used by an average of 2379 passengers daily.

Surrounding area
 Toyono High School
 Sunohara Junior High School

See also
 List of railway stations in Japan

References

External links

Official home page 

Railway stations in Japan opened in 1988
Railway stations in Aichi Prefecture
Toyota, Aichi